Electric Fire is the fourth solo album by Roger Taylor, from the band Queen. It features a cover of John Lennon's song "Working Class Hero".
The album came not long before Taylor's performance at Cyber Barn in the same year. Following the gloomy album Happiness?, Electric Fire also included gloomy elements but was, on the whole, a bit more bright.

Track listing
All tracks by Roger Taylor, except where noted.

"Pressure On" – 4:56
"A Nation of Haircuts" – 3:32
"Believe in Yourself" – 5:00
"Surrender" – 3:36
"People on Streets" – 4:11
"The Whisperers" (Taylor, Nicholas Evans) – 6:05
"Is It Me?" – 3:23
"No More Fun" – 4:13
"Tonight" – 3:44
"Where Are You Now?" – 4:48
"Working Class Hero" (John Lennon) – 4:41
"London Town – C'mon Down" – 7:13

Personnel
Roger Taylor – vocals, drums, percussion, keyboards, bass, guitars
Keith Prior – drums
Steve Barnacle – bass
Mike Crossley – keyboards
Jason Falloon – guitars, bass
Keith Airey – guitars
Matthew Exelby – guitars
Jonathan Perkins – keyboards, vocals
Treana Morris – vocals

Singles
"Pressure On" (UK #45)
"Surrender" (UK #38)

Roger Taylor (Queen drummer) albums
1998 albums
Parlophone albums
EMI Records albums
Albums produced by Roger Taylor (Queen drummer)